A tarai-bune, or tub-turned boat, is a traditional Japanese fishing boat found mainly on Sado Island and used for catching abalone and other mollusks. The design originated from need to fish in the narrow coves formed by earthquakes.

In popular culture 
Tarai Bune boats have appeared in:
Spirited Away, animated movie
Skies of Arcadia, video game by Sega
Tales of Symphonia, video game by Bandai Namco
Tides, video game by Shallot Games

External links 

Tarai Bune of Sado Island
Article about saving the tub-turned boat by teaching children how to use them

Indigenous boats
Fishing in Japan